Sprekelia is a genus of Mesoamerican plants in the Amaryllis family, subfamily Amaryllidoideae. Sprekelia plants are sometimes called Aztec lilies or Jacobean lilies although they are not true lilies.  This genus has been submerged in Zephyranthes, but  is accepted by Plants of the World Online with a single species, Sprekelia formosissima, endemic to Mexico.

Taxonomy 
This genus is named after Johann Heinrich von Spreckelsen (1691–1764), who supplied the plants to Lorenz Heister. Sprekelia is placed in tribe Hippeastreae, subtribe Hippeastrinae. , a single species is accepted by Plants of the World Online, Sprekelia formosissima. S. formosissima was first described by Carl Linnaeus in 1753 as Amaryllis formosissima and transferred to Sprekelia by William Herbert in 1821.

There are crosses between the genera Hippeastrum and Sprekelia, referred to as "x Hippeastrelia", as well as at least one cross between the three genera Hippeastrum, Sprekelia, and Zephyranthes, x Howardara.

Species formerly included
Species formerly placed in Sprekelia but now accepted elsewhere include:
Sprekelia cybister Herb. = Hippeastrum cybister
Sprekelia howardii Lehmiller = Zephyranthes sprekeliopsis
Sprekelia spectabilis Hoehne = Hippeastrum angustifolium

Distribution
Sprekelia formosissima is endemic to Mexico. It has been introduced to the Mariana Islands.<ref name=POWO_66815-1>{{cite web |title='Sprekelia formosissima (L.) Herb.. |work=Plants of the World Online |publisher=Royal Botanic Gardens, Kew|url=https://powo.science.kew.org/taxon/urn:lsid:ipni.org:names:66815-1 |access-date=2023-01-30 }}</ref>

CultivationSprekelia formosissima'' is common in cultivation, planted in warm climates or raised in pots in colder climates, or planted and lifted, much as the gladiolus.  Even when well grown, bulbs often do not bloom every year. The Royal Horticultural Society recommends it as an interesting choice for heated conservatories or greenhouses. It is available from commercial suppliers.

Gallery

References

Bibliography 
 

Amaryllidoideae
Monotypic Amaryllidaceae genera